Josiah is a given name derived from the Hebrew Yoshi-yahu ("God has healed".

The Latin form Josias was used in some early English translations of the Bible.

Josiah was among the five most popular names for Black newborn boys in the American state of Virginia in 2022.

Notable people with the given name

A
Josiah Abavu (born 1987), Papua New Guinean rugby league footballer
Josiah Gardner Abbott (1814–1891), American politician
Josiah Alexander (1826–1882), English cricketer
Josiah M. Anderson (1807–1861), American politician
Josiah Haynes Armstrong (1842–1898), American bishop
Josiah D. Arnold (1820–1903), American businessman and politician

B
Josiah Howell Bagster (1847–1893), Australian politician
Josiah Bailey (1873–1946), American politician
Josiah Barber (1771–1842), American politician
Josiah Bartlett (disambiguation), multiple people
Josiah Beckwith (1734–1800), English antiquary
Josiah H. Beeman V (1935–2006), American political figure
Josiah Begole (1815–1896), American politician
Josiah Belden (1815–1892), American pioneer
Josiah Fisher Bell (1820–1890), American soldier
Josiah Binnema (born 1997), Canadian swimmer
Josiah Blackburn (1823–1890), English journalist
Josiah Bleakley (1754–1822), Canadian fur trader
Josiah Ofori Boateng (born 1931), Ghanaian judge
Josiah H. Bonney (1817–1887), American businessman and politician
Josiah Booth (1852–1929), English composer
Josiah Boothby (1837–1916), English colonial administrator
Josiah Bowden (1858–1936), British fencer
Josiah Boydell (1752–1817), British publisher
Josiah Brewer (1796–1872), American minister
Josiah Sandford Brigham (1818–1892), American-Canadian physician and politician
Josiah Bronson (born 1997), American football player
Josiah Brown (1816–1875), American civil engineer
Josiah Bruce (1840–1913), Canadian photographer
Josiah Bunting III (born 1939), American educator
Josiah Burchett (1666–1746), British politician
Josiah Burgess (1689–1719), English pirate
Josiah Butler (1779–1854), American politician
Josiah Butterfield (1795–1871), American religious leader

C
Josiah Abigail Patterson Campbell (1830–1917), American politician
Josiah Carter (1813–1868), American politician
Josiah Champagné (1755–1840), British military commander
Josiah Chapman (1891–1953), English footballer
Josiah Child (1630–1699), English merchant
Josiah Chinamano (1923–1984), Zimbabwean politician
Josiah Clark (1814–1878), American pianist
Josiah Latimer Clark (1822–1898), English engineer
Josiah Clerk (1639–1714), English physician
Josiah Chorley (1652–1719), English minister
Josiah Clowes (1735–1794), English civil engineer
Josiah Coatney (born 1996), American football player
Josiah Coffin (1804–1887), Canadian politician
Josiah D. Coleman (born 1972), American judge
Josiah Collins (disambiguation), multiple people
Josiah Henry Combs (1832–1894), American lawyer
Josiah Conder (disambiguation), multiple people
Josiah Parsons Cooke (1827–1894), American scientist
Josiah Cottin (1771–1843), English army officer
Josiah Cotton (1679/1680–1756), English missionary
Josiah Coulthurst (1893–1970), English cricketer
Josiah Court (1841–1938), English physician
Josiah Crosby (1880–1958), British diplomat
Josiah Crudup (1791–1872), American politician
Josiah Crump (1828–1890), American clerk
Josiah M. Curtis (1844–1875), American soldier

D
Josiah Dean (1748–1818), American politician
Josiah Deguara (born 1997), American football player
Josiah Dent (1817–1899), American politician
Josiah Didier (born 1993), American ice hockey player
Josiah Diston (1667–1737), English banker
Josiah Eustace Dodd (1865–1952), Australian pipe organ bilder
Josiah Dallas Dort (1861–1925), American industrialist
Josiah Hayden Drummond (1827–1902), American attorney
Josiah E. DuBois Jr. (1912–1983), American attorney
Josiah Dunham (1769–1844), American politician
Josiah Dwight (1671–1748), English minister

E
Josiah Griffin Ely (1829–1886), American physician
Josiah Emery (1731/1732–1794), English watch maker
Josiah Evans (disambiguation), multiple people
Josiah T. Everest (1800–1873), American politician

F
Josiah Failing (1806–1877), American politician
Josiah Firth (1826–1897), New Zealand farmer
Josiah Fisher, American judge
Josiah S. Fisher, American politician
Josiah Fisk (1781–1844), American politician
Josiah Flynt (1869–1907), American sociologist
Josiah Forshall (1795–1863), English librarian
Josiah Forster (1782–1870), English teacher
Josiah Fox (1763–1847), British naval architect
Josiah Francis (disambiguation), multiple people
Josiah Franklin (1657–1745), English businessman
Josiah Frederick Fraser (1870–1942), Canadian businessman
Josiah Freeman, American photographer
Josiah B. French (1799–1876), American banker

G
Josiah Willard Gibbs (1839–1903), American physicist
Josiah Willard Gibbs Sr. (1790–1861), American theologian
Josiah Given (1828–1908), American judge
Josiah Gondo (??–1972), Zimbabwean politician
Josiah Gorgas (1818–1883), American general
Josiah Gregg (1806–1850), American merchant
Josiah Bushnell Grinnell (1821–1891), American politician
Josiah Grout (1841–1925), American lawyer and politician
Josiah Gumede (disambiguation), multiple people

H
Josiah Hanan (1868–1954), New Zealand politician
Josiah D. Hank Jr. (1875–1924), American attorney and politician
Josiah Hardy (1715–1790), British colonial administrator
Josiah Harlan (1799–1871), American adventurer
Josiah Harmar (1753-1813), American army officer
Josiah A. Harris (1808–1876), American politician
Josiah Hasbrouck (1755–1821), American politician
Josiah Johnson Hawes (1808–1901), American photographer
Josiah J. Hazen (1871–1948), American football player
Josiah Marshall Heath (??–1581), English metallurgist
Josiah Henson (1789–1883), American author
Josiah Henson (wrestler) (1922–2012), American wrestler
Josiah Heyman (born 1958), American anthropologist
Josiah Duane Hicks (1844–1923), American politician
Josiah Ogden Hoffman (1766–1837), American lawyer and politician
Josiah Gilbert Holland (1819–1881), American novelist
Josiah Hooper (1807–1878), Canadian merchant
Josiah Hornblower (1729–1809), English engineer
Josiah Hort (1674–1751), English clergyman
Josiah Hort, 2nd Baronet (1791–1876), Irish politician
Josiah Andrew Hudleston (1799–1865), English-Irish civil servant
Josiah Charles Hughes (1843–1886), Canadian politician
Josiah Hungwe (born 1935), Zimbabwean politician

I
Josiah Idowu-Fearon (born 1949), Nigerian bishop

J
Josiah Jamison (born 1982), American sprinter
Josiah Johnson (disambiguation), multiple people
Josiah S. Johnston (1784–1833), American politician
Josiah Judah (born 1978), American boxer

K
Josiah Kantiyok (born 1968), Nigerian tribal leader
Josiah Mwangi Kariuki (1929–1975), Kenyan politician
Josiah Kelsall (1892–1974), English footballer
Josiah Kerr (1861–1920), American politician
Josiah Kibira, Tanzanian filmmaker

L
Josiah Lamborn (1809–1847), American politician
Josiah Lau (born 1940), Hong Kong teacher
Josiah Leavitt (1744–1804), American physician
Josiah Leming (born 1989), American singer-songwriter
Josiah K. Lilly Jr. (1893–1966), American businessman
Josiah K. Lilly Sr. (1861–1948), American industrialist
Josiah Litch (1809–1886), American preacher
Josiah S. Little (1801–1862), American politician
Josiah O. Livingston (1837–1917), American army officer
Josiah Lincoln Lowe (1905–1997), American mycologist

M
Josiah Macy Jr. (1837–1876), American sea captain
Josiah H. MacQuarrie (1897–1971), Canadian judge
Josiah Maduabuchi (born 1988), Nigerian footballer
Josiah Magnuson (born 1991), American politician
Josiah Majekodunmi (1927–1996), Nigerian athlete
Josiah Martin (1737–1786), English colonist
Josiah Martin (teacher) (1843–1916), New Zealand teacher
Josiah Marvel Jr. (1904–1955), American diplomat
Josiah Mason (1795–1881), English industrialist
Josiah Masters (1763–1822), American politician
Josiah McCracken (1874–1962), American football player
Josiah McElheny (born 1966), American artist
Josiah Meigs (1757–1822), American academic
Josiah Middaugh (born 1978), American triathlete
Josiah Miller (1832–1890), English minister
Josiah Mills (1862–1929), English cricketer
Josiah Lewis Morgan (1893–1982), Welsh pilot

N
Josiah T. Newcomb (1868–1944), American lawyer and politician
Josiah Ng (born 1980), Malaysian cyclist
Josiah C. Nott (1804–1873), American surgeon

O
Josiah Ober, American professor
Josiah Oldfield (1863–1953), English lawyer

P
Josiah Pardo (1626–1684), Dutch rabbi
Josiah Parker (1751–1810), American politician
Josiah Parkes (1793–1791), English civil engineer
Josiah Lamberson Parrish (1806–1895), American missionary
Josiah Partridge (1805–1897), Australian lawyer
Josiah Patkotak (born 1994), American politician
Josiah Patterson (1837–1904), American soldier
Josiah Edward Paul (1853–??), English rugby union footballer
Josiah Williams Pearce (1850–1938), Canadian merchant
Josiah Pearson (1841–1895), Australian bishop
Josiah Pender (1819–1864), American soldier
Josiah Phillips (1830–1894), American soldier
Josiah Little Pickard (1824–1914), American academic administrator
Josiah Pierce (1792–1866), American politician
Josiah ben Joseph Pinto (1565–1648), Syrian rabbi
Josiah Pittman (1816–1886), British organist
Josiah Pleydell (1641–1707), English priest
Josiah Burr Plumb (1816–1888), American-Canadian businessman
Josiah Pratt (1768–1844), English clergyman
Josiah Preston (1885–??), English footballer
Josiah Johnston Preston (1855–1937), Canadian politician
Josiah Priest (1788–1861), American writer

Q
Josiah Quincy (disambiguation), multiple people

R
Josiah Ransome-Kuti (1855–1930), Nigerian clergyman
Josiah Rees (1744–1804), Welsh minister
Josiah Rees (judge) (1821–1899), Bermudian judge
Josiah Royce (1855–1916), American philosopher
Josiah Russell (1844–1911), English businessman

S
Josiah Scott (disambiguation), multiple people
Josiah Seton (born 1979), Liberian footballer
Josiah T. Settle (1850–1915), American lawyer
Josiah Sherman, American politician
Josiah Sleeper (??–1946), American businessman
Josiah Smith (disambiguation), multiple people
Josiah Snelgrove (born 1986), Canadian soccer player
Josiah Snelling (1782–1828), American military officer
Josiah Sowande (1858–1936), Nigerian poet
Josiah Spaulding (1922–1983), American businessman
Josiah Spode (1733–1797), English potter
Josiah Edward Spurr (1870–1950), American geologist
Josiah Stamp (1880–1941), British civil servant
Josiah Standish (1633–1690), English colonist
Josiah Steinbrick (born 1981), American instrumentalist
Josiah St. John (born 1992), Canadian football player
Josiah Strong (1847–1916), American clergyman
Josiah Sutherland (1804–1887), American lawyer and politician
Josiah Symon (1846–1934), Scottish-Australian lawyer and politician

T
Josiah Taft (1709–1756), American soldier
Josiah Tattnall (disambiguation), multiple people
Josiah Tauaefa (born 1997), American football player
Josiah Thomas (disambiguation), multiple people
Josiah Thompson (born 1935), American writer
Josiah Tongogara (1938–1979), Zimbabwean military officer
Josiah Charles Trent (1914–1948), American surgeon
Josiah Trimmingham (born 1996), Trinidadian politician
Josiah Trowbridge (1785–1862), American politician
Josiah Tuck (1824–1900), American inventor
Josiah Tucker (1713–1799), Welsh clergyman
Josiah Tungamirai (1948–2005), Zimbabwean military officer
Josiah Turner (1821–1901), American lawyer and politician
Josiah Turner (judge) (1811–1907), American judge
Josiah Twum-Boafo (born 1997), South African rugby union footballer

V
Josiah Alexander Van Orsdel (1860–1937), American judge
Josiah Vavasseur (1834–1908), English industrialist

W
Josiah T. Walls (1842–1905), American politician
Josiah Warren (1798–1874), American anarchist
Josiah Ogden Watson (1784–1852), American politician
Josiah Wedgwood (disambiguation), multiple people
Josiah White (1781–1850), American industrialist
Josiah Whitney (1819–1896), American geologist
Josiah P. Wilbarger (1801–1845), American settler
Josiah Willard (1805–1868), American farmer
Josiah B. Williams (1810–1883), American businessman
Josiah Winslow (1628–1680), English politician
Josiah O. Wolcott (1877–1938), American lawyer and politician
Josiah Wolf, American drummer
Josiah Wood (1843–1927), Canadian lawyer
Josiah Woodward (1657–1712), English clergyman

Y
Josiah Yazdani (born 1991), American football player
Josiah T. Young (1831–1907), American editor and politician

Z
Josiah Zayner (born 1981), American bioengineer
Josiah Zuro (1887–1930), Polish-American pianist

Fictional characters
Josiah Bartlet, US President in the television series The West Wing
Josiah S. Carberry, fictional professor at Brown University
Josiah Power, DC Comics superhero
Josiah X, super-soldier in the Marvel Comics Universe
Josiah Trelawny, conman in the video game Red Dead Redemption 2

References

Hebrew masculine given names
English masculine given names